Athanas Misiko Wafula Wamunyinyi is a Kenyan politician who is leader of the Democratic Action Party. He began his career in politics when he was elected as MP for Kanduyi Constituency in 1997. He was in his twenties at the time. Wamunyinyi was re-elected for the same seat in 2002. In the infamous 2007 elections he lost his seat but later re-emerged to serve another 2 consecutive terms from 2013 to 2022.

Political career 
He was Deputy Chairperson of the African Union Commission for Somalia.

Wamunyinyi lost his seat to John Makali from Ford-K in the 2022 Kenyan general election.
Wafula Wamunyinyi later vied for the senatorial post that was left vacant after the then Bungoma senator Moses Wetangula became speaker of the National Assembly. However, he lost to David Wafula Wakoli, coming at position three behind Mwambu Mabonga.

References 

Living people
Year of birth missing (living people)
Place of birth missing (living people)
Leaders of political parties in Kenya
21st-century Kenyan politicians
Members of the 11th Parliament of Kenya
Members of the 12th Parliament of Kenya
African Union officials